The seventh season of Dynasty originally aired in the United States on ABC from September 24, 1986 through May 5, 1987. The series, created by Richard and Esther Shapiro and produced by Aaron Spelling, revolves around the Carringtons, a wealthy family residing in Denver, Colorado.

Season seven stars John Forsythe as millionaire oil magnate Blake Carrington; Linda Evans as his wife Krystle; Jack Coleman as Blake and Alexis's earnest son Steven; Gordon Thomson as Blake and Alexis's eldest son Adam; Heather Locklear as Krystle's niece and Steven's ex-wife Sammy Jo; Michael Nader as Alexis's husband Dex Dexter; Karen Cellini as Blake and Alexis's youngest daughter, Amanda; Diahann Carroll as Blake's half-sister Dominique Deveraux; Wayne Northrop as Blake's former chauffeur Michael Culhane; Ted McGinley as Clay Fallmont; and Joan Collins as Alexis Colby, Blake's ex-wife and the mother of Adam, Fallon, Steven, and Amanda. The season also features Christopher Cazenove as Blake's brother, Ben Carrington; Kate O'Mara as Alexis' sister Caress Morell; Terri Garber as Ben's daughter Leslie; Leann Hunley as Blake's secretary Dana Waring; and Cassie Yates as Sarah Curtis, and old friend of Dex's. Though starring as Jeff Colby and Fallon Carrington on The Colbys, John James and Emma Samms each appeared in two episodes of season seven as these characters.

Development
Although the first episode of season seven, "The Victory", premiered with a high Nielsen rating of a 20.1, it was overtaken by Magnum, P.I., now in the same time slot on CBS. Dynasty ultimately fell to #24 in the United States for the season.

During the period between the production of seasons six and seven, Catherine Oxenberg vacated the role of Amanda Carrington, purportedly due to a salary dispute. Oxenberg's publicist insisted that the actress left Dynasty voluntarily, while several media outlets reported that she was fired. The role was immediately recast with Karen Cellini, who appeared for 13 episodes of the series' seventh season before the character was written out in the 1987 episode "The Rig".

Plot
As the seventh season begins, Blake stops short of killing Alexis, who has taken all of his assets, including the mansion. Claudia has died in the fire she set at La Mirage, and Amanda (now played by Karen Cellini) is rescued by a returning Michael Culhane, Blake's chauffeur from the first season. Blake turns the tables on Ben and Alexis and recovers his wealth, but loses his memory after an oil rig explosion. Alexis finds Blake and, with everyone believing he is dead, perpetuates the belief that they are still married. Living with a clean slate, Alexis finds herself softening to Blake but ultimately tells him the truth as he reunites with Krystle. Krystina receives a heart transplant but is later temporarily kidnapped by Sarah Curtis, the mother of the girl from whom Krystina received her new heart; Sammy Jo's marriage to Clay crumbles and she falls into bed with Steven; Amanda leaves town; and Ben's daughter Leslie arrives. Adam's season-long romance with Blake's secretary Dana Waring culminates in a wedding, which is punctuated in the May 6, 1987 season finale by Alexis's car plunging off a bridge into a river and the violent return of a vengeful Matthew Blaisdel (Bo Hopkins).

Cast

Main

John Forsythe as Blake Carrington
Linda Evans as Krystle Carrington
John James as Jeff Colby
Gordon Thomson as Adam Carrington
Emma Samms as Fallon Carrington Colby
Jack Coleman as Steven Carrington
Michael Nader as Dex Dexter
Heather Locklear as Sammy Jo Carrington
Ted McGinley as Clay Fallmont
Terri Garber as Leslie Carrington
 Cassie Yates as Sarah Curtis
 Leann Hunley as Dana Waring
Christopher Cazenove as Ben Carrington
Karen Cellini as Amanda Carrington
Wayne Northrop as Michael Culhane
Kate O'Mara as Caress Morell
Diahann Carroll as Dominique Deveraux
Ricardo Montalbán as Zach Powers
Joan Collins as Alexis Carrington

Recurring

William Beckley as Gerard
Virginia Hawkins as Jeanette Robbins
Richard Lawson as Nick Kimball
Paul Burke as Neal McVane
James Sutorious as Gordon Wales
Betty Harford as Hilda Gunnerson
Richard Anderson as Buck Fallmont
Troy Beyer as Jackie Deveraux
Patricia Crowley as Emily Fallmont
Kimberly Beck as Claire Prentice
Jon Cypher as Dirk Maurier
Alan Fudge as Phil Thorpe
Neil Dickson as Gavin Maurier

Notable guest stars

Clyde Kusatsu as Dr. Chen
Linda Thorson as Dr. Mansfield
Bo Hopkins as Matthew Blaisdel

Cast notes

Episodes 

Season two of The Colbys aired concurrently with Dynasty season seven.

Reception
In season seven, Dynasty was ranked #24 in the United States with a 17.2 Nielsen rating.

References

External links 
 

1986 American television seasons
1987 American television seasons
Dynasty (1981 TV series) seasons